The 1999–2000 Slovak 1.Liga season was the seventh season of the Slovak 1. Liga, the second level of ice hockey in Slovakia. 12 teams participated in the league, and Marinskeho hokeja club won the championship.

Standings

External links
 Season on hockeyarchives.info

Slovak 1. Liga
Slovak 1. Liga seasons
Liga